During the 2015–16 season, Red Star competed in the Serbian SuperLiga, the Serbian Cup, and the UEFA Europa League.

Competitions

Overview

Serbian SuperLiga

The 2015–16 season was Red Star's 10th consecutive season in the Serbian SuperLiga, since the league was formed during the summer of 2005.

Results by round

Regular season

Championship round

Serbian Cup

Matches

UEFA Europa League

First qualifying round

References

Serbian football clubs 2015–16 season
Red Star Belgrade seasons
Serbian football championship-winning seasons